Lucie Šafářová was the defending champion, but lost in the first round to qualifier Ekaterina Alexandrova.

Heather Watson won the tournament, defeating Anna Karolína Schmiedlová in the final, 7–6(7–5), 6–0.

Seeds

Main draw

Finals

Top half

Bottom half

External links 
 Main draw

Sparta Prague Open - Singles
WTA Prague Open